"Rendezvous" is the twenty-fifth single by the Japanese rock band Buck-Tick, released on June 6, 2007. The title track deviates from the band's usual darker themes, both the beat and lyrics are lighthearted and upbeat. The second track is an updated version of My Eyes and Your Eyes, originally featured on the 1987 album Sexual XXXXX!. It placed 9th on Oricon's weekly chart.

Track listing

Musicians
Atsushi Sakurai - Voice
Hisashi Imai - Guitar
Hidehiko Hoshino - Guitar
Yutaka Higuchi - Bass
Toll Yagami - Drums

References

2007 singles
2007 songs
Buck-Tick songs
Ariola Japan singles
Songs with music by Hisashi Imai
Songs with lyrics by Atsushi Sakurai